Caravans, a novel by James A. Michener, was published in 1963.

The story is set in Afghanistan immediately following World War II. The protagonist, Mark Miller, is stationed in Kabul at the American embassy and is given the assignment of an investigation to find a young woman, Ellen Jasper, also from the United States, who has disappeared after her marriage to an Afghan national thirteen months previously.

During his journey through Afghanistan, Miller comes to a deeper understanding of the complexities and nuances of contemporary Afghan life. His travels also reveal the similarities of human nature across cultural and social boundaries.

The novel was the basis of a 1978 film with the same title starring Anthony Quinn and Jennifer O'Neill.

References

1963 American novels
Novels by James A. Michener
Novels set in Afghanistan
American novels adapted into films
Random House books